Local Matters was a privately held Delaware corporation based in Denver, Colorado created through a merger between Aptas, Inc. and ISx, and YP Solutions announced on May 23, 2005.  In October 2005, Local Matters acquired Online Web Marketing, the makers of AreaGuides.net.

Local Matters is a solutions and services provider for media publishers, internet yellow pages, franchise organizations and the real estate industry. Technology solutions are targeted to directory publishers and real estate groups worldwide with a focus on local search.

Aptas, Inc.
Aptas, Inc. was founded March 19, 2002 in San Jose, California between Nextron, Inc. and AccelX with a focus on SME Service Solutions for Directory Assistance providers.  The headquarters was set in Denver, CO.  The first CEO of the new company was Perry Evans.

ISx
ISx was merged with Aptas, Inc. and YP Solutions in 2005 and has since been renamed Local Matters Voice and Wireless Division, Inc.  ISx stood for Information Services Extended, Inc. and specialized in directory assistance solutions for telecommunications companies, call centers, and content providers.  Prior to 2001, ISx was a business unit of IBM dating back into the 1970s.  The company is based out of Fort Lauderdale, Florida.  Local Matters Voice and Wireless Division, Inc. operates as a subsidiary of Local Matters and retained the CEO from ISx.  Local Matters press releases still refer to the division as ISx.

MyAreaGuides.net
MyAreaGuides.net (or AreaGuides.net) is a location-based portal whereby one can search for services in a certain locality, including those with small populations.  Online Web Marketing (OLWM) is the creator of AreaGuides and was acquired by Local Matters on November 1, 2005.

OLWM was created as a website creation and marketing firm based out of St. George, Utah and has a portfolio full of destination sites.

References

Software companies based in Colorado
Defunct software companies of the United States